Ludwig Berger may refer to:

 Ludwig Berger (composer) (1777–1839), German composer
 Ludwig Berger (director) (1892–1969), German film director